The 73rd British Academy Film Awards, more commonly known as the BAFTAs, were held on 2 February 2020 at the Royal Albert Hall in London, honouring the best national and foreign films of 2019. Presented by the British Academy of Film and Television Arts, accolades were handed out for the best feature-length film and documentaries of any nationality that were screened at British cinemas in 2019.

The nominees were announced on 7 January 2020. The psychological thriller Joker received the most nominations in eleven categories; The Irishman and Once Upon a Time in Hollywood followed with ten apiece. The ceremony also marked the introduction of the BAFTA Award for Best Casting; Shayna Markowitz won for Joker.

The ceremony was hosted by Graham Norton (who also hosts the BAFTA TV Awards), replacing Joanna Lumley following her two years of service as host.

Winners and nominees

The nominees were announced on 7 January 2020. The winners were announced on 2 February 2020.

BAFTA Fellowship

 Kathleen Kennedy

Outstanding British Contribution to Cinema

 Andy Serkis

Awards
Winners are listed first and highlighted in boldface.

Statistics

Ceremony information
The ceremony took place in the Royal Albert Hall and was hosted by Irish television comedian Graham Norton, who had previously hosted the 2019 British Academy Television Awards. Viewing ratings for the ceremony fell to a twelve-year low, peaking at 3.5 million, though being the most-viewed show in the UK after 22:00. The ratings drop may be a result of the broadcast delay, with many live news outlets publishing the results before they were televised and revealed on television.

Discussions about the lack of diversity within the award nominations surrounded the ceremony, with the host referring to it as "the year when white men finally broke through". He also described eleven-time nominee Joker as "essentially the story of a white man who makes himself even whiter". Best Director presenter (a category of all-male nominees) Rebel Wilson joked about the absence of females in the category, quipping: "Honestly, I just don't have the balls." Best Actor in a Leading Role winner Joaquin Phoenix used his speech to comment on the "systemic racism" of the BAFTAs and acting industry in general. Speaking ahead of the ceremony, BAFTA chairwoman Pippa Harris addressed her frustration in the lack of recognition for female directors, as well as the issues around diversity as a whole. In his closing speech to the ceremony, BAFTA president Prince William had prepared a speech discussing the issue, saying that "a wide-ranging review of the whole awards process" was underway and that lack of diversity "simply cannot be right in this day and age".

1917 was the night's biggest winner, winning seven prizes in total of its nine nominations, including Best Film and Best Director (Sam Mendes), despite not having any acting nominees and thus becoming a favourite for the then upcoming 92nd Academy Awards; it lost to Parasite. Mendes became the first British winner to win Best Director in eleven years. Since votes for the Academy Awards must be registered two days after the BAFTA Awards, Screen Daily noted that 1917 would be a safe choice for Academy members, who are averse to streaming films based on 1917s marketing as a "must-see on the big screen". This compares to the Netflix film The Irishman being the night's biggest loser, taking no awards despite ten nominations; Netflix productions in total received twenty-three nominations, winning only two: Best Actress in a Supporting Role for Laura Dern (Marriage Story) and Best Animated Film (Klaus). Screen Daily also suggested that there is anecdotal evidence of Netflix not supporting its nominees as much as it did last year for Roma (2018). The writers of Screen Daily additionally suggested that there was some controversy surrounding the British identity of some films nominated for Outstanding British Film; 1917 is financed by the US, and Retablo is a Peruvian film co-produced with Norway and Germany, whose Peruvian director—Álvaro Delgado-Aparicio—only lives in London. The ceremony also marked the first year since the 30th British Academy Film Awards (1977) in which there were no British acting winners.

Wins marking diversity were Outstanding Debut by a British Writer, Director or Producer for Bait, a film described by its writer-director as "a black and white, 16-millimetre, hand-processed, post-synced film in Academy ratio about Cornish fishing people"; Best Documentary for For Sama, a personal story of bombings at a Syrian hospital made by the family involved, with them using their speech to "implore the UK not to ignore the ongoing plight of the people of the Syrian city of Idlib"; and the Rising Star Award for Micheal Ward, star of Rapman's Blue Story (which received no nominations), who used his speech to say that he "feels like we're going in the right direction" in terms of diversity.

Best Actress in a Leading Role winner Renée Zellweger noted in the press room that she felt like part of "the British gang"; after accepting her award, Hugh Grant had taken to the stage to present, quipping "well done Jones" as Zellweger left, a reference to their roles in the British film Bridget Jones's Diary (2001). Later in the press room, the young Sama Al-Kateab, who had been held by her parents on stage while accepting Best Documentary, was allowed to roam and took to running the length of the stage and playing with microphones. With his fifth win for Best Cinematography for 1917, Roger Deakins becomes the most-decorated BAFTA winner in the category. Collecting his BAFTA, he said: "I think it was George Orwell that said all films are special but some films are more special than others, and for me this was a really special film." The recent Brexit was also mentioned, appearing in Brad Pitt's acceptance speech for Best Actor in a Supporting Role delivered by co-star Margot Robbie; Pitt's speech also noted that he would name his award "Harry" because he's going to take it to the United States.

In Memoriam

 Rutger Hauer
 Terry Rawlings
 Lawrence G. Paull
 Bibi Andersson
 John Sargent
 Terry Jones
 Richard Williams
 John Singleton
 Peter Fonda
 Robert Evans
 Stanley Donen
 Robert Forster
 Nigel Goldsack
 Agnès Varda
 Michelle Guish
 Nik Powell
 Franco Zeffirelli
 Valentina Cortese
 Buck Henry
 Danny Aiello
 Anna Karina
 Gerry Lewis
 Peter Mayhew
 Norman Garwood
 Sue Lyon
 Freddie Jones
 Doris Day

See also
 9th AACTA International Awards
 92nd Academy Awards
 45th César Awards
 25th Critics' Choice Awards
 72nd Directors Guild of America Awards
 33rd European Film Awards
 77th Golden Globe Awards
 40th Golden Raspberry Awards
 34th Goya Awards
 35th Independent Spirit Awards
 25th Lumières Awards
 10th Magritte Awards
 7th Platino Awards
 31st Producers Guild of America Awards
 24th Satellite Awards
 46th Saturn Awards
 26th Screen Actors Guild Awards
 72nd Writers Guild of America Awards

References

External links
 

2020 in British cinema
2019 film awards
2020 in London
Events at the Royal Albert Hall
2019 awards in the United Kingdom
Film073
February 2020 events in the United Kingdom